The 1939–40 Irish Cup was the 60th edition of the premier knock-out cup competition in Northern Irish football. 

Ballymena United won the tournament for the 1st time, defeating Glenavon 2–0 in the final at Windsor Park.

Results

First round

|}

Replay

|}

Second replay

|}

Quarter-finals

|}

Semi-finals

|}

Final

References

External links
 Northern Ireland Cup Finals. Rec.Sport.Soccer Statistics Foundation (RSSSF)

Irish Cup seasons
1939–40 domestic association football cups
1939–40 in Northern Ireland association football